Darst is a surname. Notable people with the surname include:

David Darst, CFA, an American financier, educator and author
Jeanne Darst, American author
Joseph Darst (1889–1953), the thirty-seventh Mayor of St. Louis
Margaret Darst Corbett (1889–1962), American vision educator who used the discredited Bates method
Seth Darst, American biochemist, member of the United States National Academy of Sciences